Boussu-en-Fagne is a village of Wallonia and a district of the municipality of Couvin, located in the province of Namur, Belgium.

Archaeological excavations in the area have revealed a Neolithic settlement as well as a large Roman villa, and a subsidiary Roman road. Merovingian graves have also been discovered. From the early Middle Ages, the territory gradually became part of the lands of the lords of Chimay. A forge operated in the village between 1494 and 1850. A castle, château de Boussu-en-Fagne, was built here, burnt down by Spanish troops before 1565 and successively rebuilt. Its current appearance is in a Gothic Revival style. The current village church is from 1855.

References

External links

Former municipalities of Namur (province)